This article lists Russian association football clubs whose men's sides have won competitive honours run by official governing bodies. Friendly competitions and matches organized between clubs are not included. The football associations FIFA and UEFA run international and European competitions; and Russian Football Union, and its mostly self-governing subsidiary bodies the Russian Premier League, Russian Football National League and Russian Professional Football League, run national competitions. Russian Amateur Football Leagues organise amateur competitions, but a full list of those honours is not provided in this article.

Summary totals 
Championship — Soviet Football Championship + Russian Football Championship
Cup — Soviet Cup + Russian Cup
Super Cup — Russian Super Cup + Soviet Super Cup
League Cup — USSR Federation Cup + All-Union Committee of Physical Culture and Sports Tournament + Russian Premier League Cup
UEFA competitions — UEFA Europa League (UEL) + UEFA Super Cup (USC)

Honours by period

Soviet period (1936 – 1992) 
This section presents a table of clubs by honours won in the period from 1936 to 1992. The last recorded tournament is 1991–92 Soviet Cup.

Russian period (1992 – present) 
This section presents a table of clubs by honours won in the period from 1992 to the present. The first recorded tournament is 1995 Russian Top League.

Russian national Trophies 
Trophies in official competitions run by official Russian football governing bodies:

Trophies by year 
This section presents Russian football clubs the winners of the tournaments for each year. If the tournament in the year was not held, the corresponding field contains "was not held". If the competition was not won by the Russian club (refers to the USSR tournaments and European cups), then the corresponding field contains dash ("—").

"*" — Champions also won the National Cup that season.

References

External links
 
 
 
 
 
 

 
clubs by honour
Football clubs